Lapland (also Flatland) is a ghost town in Greenwood County, Kansas, United States.  Currently only a farmstead remains.

References

Further reading

External links
 Greenwood County maps: Current, Historic, KDOT

Ghost towns in Kansas